The 2013–14 season was Olympiacos's 55th consecutive season in the Super League Greece and their 88th year in existence. Olympiacos also participated in the Greek cup and 2013–14 UEFA Champions League group stage. The first game of the season took place at OAKA on 19 August against AEL Kalloni.

Olympiacos won the domestic title for the fourth year in a row, breaking the all-time record for the biggest point difference between the first and the second team in the regular season. The most memorable accomplishment of the year was arguably the 2–0 win over Manchester United in the first leg of the round of 16 of the Champions League, though not managing to defend that score in England.

At the domestic cup, Olympiacos was eliminated in the semifinals by PAOK 2–2 on aggregate, falling off of the away goals rule.

Olympiacos' top goalscorer for the season was striker Kostas Mitroglou, who moved to Fulham at the end of the January 2014 transfer window for a fee of approximately €15 million.

Players

Current squad 

For recent transfers, see List of Greek football transfers summer 2013

Out on loan

Olympiacos U20 squad
Olympiacos U20 is the youth team of Olympiacos. They participate in the Super League U20 championship and in UEFA Youth League competition. They play their home games at the 3,000-seater Renti Training Centre in Renti, Piraeus.

Pre-season and friendlies

Competitions

Overview

Last updated: 25 January 2014

Super League Greece

League table

Results summary

Results by round

Matches

Greek Football Cup

Second round

Third round

Quarter-finals

Semi-finals

UEFA Champions League

Group stage

Knockout phase

Round of 16

Statistics

Goal scorers

Last updated: 24 November 2013

Starting 11

References

External links 
 Official Website of Olympiacos Piraeus 

Olympiacos F.C. seasons
Olympiacos
2013–14 UEFA Champions League participants seasons
Greek football championship-winning seasons